Romualdas Bitė (born 3 January 1944) is a Lithuanian middle-distance runner. He competed in the men's 3000 metres steeplechase at the 1972 Summer Olympics, representing the Soviet Union.

References

1944 births
Living people
Athletes (track and field) at the 1972 Summer Olympics
Lithuanian male middle-distance runners
Lithuanian male steeplechase runners
Soviet male middle-distance runners
Soviet male steeplechase runners
Olympic athletes of the Soviet Union
Place of birth missing (living people)